Old Cambrai Cathedral was the Gothic cathedral of the diocese of Cambrai in France, sited on what is now Place Fénelon in Cambrai but now entirely lost. Recorded as one of the largest and finest architectural monuments in northern France, it was replaced by the current Cambrai Cathedral.

History
The first plans for a new cathedral were made after a fire in 1148 destroyed the city's 11th century cathedral (built by bishops Gerard of Florennes and Gerard of Lessines), with the choir only completed around 1251 (when the canons took possession of it) and the cathedral as a whole only consecrated in 1472. Known as 'the wonder of the low countries', it measured 131 meters in length and 72 meters wide and its highest spire was 114 meters above ground level. Nineteenth century excavations to renew a road along Place Fénelon rediscovered part of its choir. That choir is sometimes attributed to Villard de Honnecourt, but the sketch of it in his portfolio is inexact and possibly by another architect. Another excavation in 1954, in advance of building work, uncovered the foundations of the south transept and another in the 2000s for the construction of the Lycée Fénelon's gymnasium revealed some buildings from the adjoining archbishop's palace, a golden key and other finds.

The cathedral, “exceeded all others in Christendom with its fine singing, its bright lighting and its sweet bells” , but most significantly, resided leading musicians and composers of the time The old cathedral was host to several notable French and Flemish composers who served as maître de chapelle including Guillaume Dufay, Robert de Févin, Johannes Lupi, and Jean de Bonmarché. Nicolas Malin and Richard Loqueville taught Dufay there; Gilet Velut was likely petit vicaire in 1409. In 1428 Philippe de Luxembourg claimed that the cathedral was the finest in all of Christianity, for the fineness of its singing, its light, and
the sweetness of its bells.

In 1791, during the French Revolution, the cathedral was used for worship under the "culte constitutionnel", but only a year later it was damaged. In 1793, it was converted into a granary and on 6 June 1796, sold to a certain Blanquart, a merchant from Saint-Quentin, who began its demolition it to sell off the stone. Its spire still survived into the early years of the First French Empire, when attempts were made to save it as a memorial to Fénelon, but the project was adjudged too costly and abandoned, with the spire left to be blown down in a storm in 1809.

The building is known only through a few surviving documents - two high-precision drawings by Louis XIV's military painter Van der Meulen, statements made on the feasibility of the Fénelon spire project, a watercolour painted by an English soldier on the fall of the First Empire, and two photographs of the royal engineers' 1695 'plan-relief' of the town (the plan-relief itself was taken by the Germans during the Second World War occupation and was destroyed in the Battle of Berlin in 1945).

Gallery

References

Sources
 Trénard, Louis (ed), 1982: Histoire de Cambrai. Presses Universitaires de Lille

External links
 Association Recherche Fénelon"
 Paroisse Notre-Dame à Cambrai

Former cathedrals in France
Churches in Nord (French department)
Gothic architecture in France
Old Cambrai Cathedral
13th-century churches in France